WNAP-FM (88.1 FM) is a radio station licensed to serve Morristown, Indiana, United States. The station is owned by New Beginnings Movement, Inc. The studios are in a house in Muncie, Indiana.

WNAP-FM broadcasts an Oldies format.

Translators
WNAP-FM programming is also carried on a network of broadcast translator stations to extend or improve the coverage area of the station.

References

External links
 

NAP-FM
Radio stations established in 2003
Shelby County, Indiana
2003 establishments in Indiana